William Belbin (7 February 1825 – 26 June 1892) was an Australian politician.

Belbin was born in Tasmania in 1825. In 1871 he was elected to the Tasmanian House of Assembly, representing the seat of South Hobart. He served until 1891. He died in 1892 in Sydney.

References

1825 births
1892 deaths
Members of the Tasmanian House of Assembly